Harold Frank Milton Arthur (born 12 December 1908 in Lismore, New South Wales – died 11 September 1972 in Sydney) was a former international motorcycle speedway rider who won the first Star Riders' Championship, the forerunner of the Speedway World Championship, in 1929.

Career
Arthur first had success in Australia, winning the Golden Helmet there in 1927. He was one of the pioneers of speedway in the UK. He brought Max Grosskreutz over from Australia in 1929 and supplied Dicky Case and Ray Tauser with machines and support for fifty percent of their earnings. Arthur was considered to have the fastest bikes in British speedway in those early years.

Arthur rode for the Stamford Bridge Pensioners from 1930 until their closure in 1932. He returned to the UK in 1934 to ride again for the Harringay Tigers. He also represented Australia in test matches against England from 1930 to 1934.

He promoted speedway in the United States, and he was also involved in the business side of the sport in Australia, where he helped Max Grosskreutz to start his career. He promoted at Sydney Royale before losing the lease in 1938. He solved this problem by building the speedway track at the Sydney Sports Ground next door. He also ran midget car circuits in Australia.

Frank Arthur died of a heart attack in Sydney on 11 September 1972.

In 2007, Arthur was one of the inaugural 10 inductees into the Australian Speedway Hall of Fame.

References

1908 births
1972 deaths
Australian speedway riders
Speedway promoters
Harringay Racers riders
People from Lismore, New South Wales
Sportsmen from New South Wales